Klara Mikhailovna Rumyanova (8 December 1929 – 18 September 2004) was a Soviet and Russian actress, voice actress and singer. She was active from 1951 to 1999.

Her childlike and endearing voice was easily recognized by generations of Soviet people from their early childhood, because she voiced numerous Russian animated films and sang countless children's songs. After the dissolution of the Soviet Union her songs have been heard even more, because of numerous releases of compact discs and tapes of children's songs from cartoons of the Soyuzmultfilm studio. She played roles in several films.

Biography
Klara Rumyanova was born on 8 December 1929 in Leningrad. In 1947, Klara moved to Moscow and on the first attempt she entered VGIK, where she studied at the course of Sergei Gerasimov and Tamara Makarova.

In childhood and adolescence, Klara had a completely different voice, a contralto. The ability to speak with her famous children's voice, she found only in her student years after a serious illness. Klara, like all the students of VGIK, toured with concerts on the Moscow Oblast and once she was very cold and almost died of croupous inflammation of the lungs. After lying in the hospital for more than a month, Klara lost her voice. The continued study at the VGIK was in jeopardy. Sergei Gerasimov showed her to a phoniatrician, but he explained that Klara has very rare vocal cords and he does not guarantee that she will be able to properly practice vocal after recovery. For half a year Gerasimov forbade Rumyanova to talk even in a whisper, and they communicated through writing. When her voice recovered, Rumyanova suddenly discovered that she could now speak in a very high voice, which came to be familiar to millions of moviegoers. In 1953, Klara graduated from VGIK and became an actress of the National Film Actors' Theatre.

As a student she started acting in film, her cinematic debut took place as an episodic role in the film The Rural Doctor (1951), by the same Gerasimov. However, in the future Klara played only supporting or episodic roles, never playing the main ones. Her notable roles were in the films The Rural Doctor (Lena), They Were the First (Varya), Four (nurse), Life first (Zoya), Resurrection (Bogodukhovskaya), Time, Forward! (Lushka) and The Twelve Chairs (Katerina Aleksandrovna). Gradually, she was less likely to be offered roles, and she practically stopped filming, which was allegedly caused by a conflict with Ivan Pyryev. For six years (from 1965 to 1970), Klara Rumyanova did not act in film at all, until the Minister of Culture Ekaterina Furtseva dismissed Pyryev from the post of the general director. A year before his death, Pyryev phoned Rumyanova and apologized to her for his behavior.

For the first time, Klara applied her "children's" voice in her debut film The Rural Doctor, where she played a woman in childbirth. While the scene was being prepared, the baby, who was supposed to represent the newborn, fell asleep, and at first could not be awaken for a long time, and then it was found that it was impossible to make him cry. Then Klara volunteered herself on the set to voice the scene. After that, Rumyanova secretly became famous at the whole Mosfilm, as an actress, able to scream in any child's voice, so that, she combined acting in film and voicing, where her voice was often used for young children. Then she began to receive the first invitations from the film studio Soyuzmultfilm, but Klara rejected them, considering her acting potential as higher than merely voicing cartoons. However, she was rarely invited to act in feature films which eventually forced her to do voice work. Her debut in animation was the cartoon The Wonderful Garden (1962). Gradually during this period, Klara began to cooperate more actively with Soyuzmultfilm, and as a result, at a time when she was no longer shooting, she became very popular as an actress and began to record on the radio and perform on the stage with children's songs and romances.

She became the only actress of the USSR to be awarded Honored Artist of the RSFSR for her work in animation. Despite this, she was very worried because she could not play in live action films, because she always considered herself a dramatic actress.

After the dissolution of the Soviet Union and the subsequent economic crisis, Rumyanova, like many actors, gradually became unemployed (she was dismissed from the National Film Actors' Theatre) and only occasionally took part in the recording of audio and audio concerts and the production of radio plays. However, even during this period, she was very selective – the general director of the studio "VOX-Records" Viktor Trukhan recalled that Rumyanova basically refused to record for audio advertising. Without work, she wrote several plays, in 2000 she published the book "My Name is a Woman" – an author's collection of her plays about significant female characters of Russian history (Nadezhda Durova, Yekaterina Vorontsova-Dashkova, Evdokiya Rostopchina).

Klara negatively spoke about Gorbachev's perestroika, the dissolution of the Soviet Union and the policies of President Yeltsin; remained a convinced supporter of communism for the rest of her life.

She died at the age of 74 on 18 September 2004 in Moscow from breast cancer. She was buried at the Donskoye Cemetery.

Selected filmography

Actress 
A Groom from the Other World (Жених с того света, 1958) as Klava, nurse
Resurrection (Воскресение, 1960) as Bogodukhovskaya
Time, Forward! (Время, вперёд!, 1965) as Lushka
Anna Karenina voice only
The Twelve Chairs (Двенадцать стульев, 1971) as Katerina Aleksandrovna
How Czar Peter the Great Married Off His Moor (Сказ про то, как царь Пётр арапа женил, 1976) as Gavrilo Rtishchev's wife
Air Crew (Экипаж, 1979) as passenger with son 
Dead Souls (Мёртвые души, 1984) as Chichikov's mother

Voices 
A Little Frog Is looking for His Father (Лягушонок ищет папу, 1964) as Grasshopper
Cheburashka, from Cheburashka animated film series
The Kid Who Counted to Ten (Козленок который считал до десяти, 1968) as Little Goat
 Hare from Well, Just You Wait! animated cartoon series (Episodes 1–18, slight uncredited archive recording in 19)
 Junior (Malysh) from the animated cartoons of Karlsson-on-the-Roof
The Boy from Umka (1969)
 Алиса в стране чудес / Alice in Wonderland (1977) [2 vinyls] Musical play, an adaptation of Alice in Wonderland, with Klara Rumyanova, Vladimir Vysotsky, V. Abdulov. Lyrics and music: Vladimir Vysotsky
 Romashka (Daisy) from the Russian animated cartoon Dunno on the Moon (1997–1999)
Grand Duke's children from Andrei Rublev (1966)

Notes

References

External links
 

1929 births
2004 deaths
20th-century Russian actresses
20th-century Russian women singers
21st-century Russian actresses
21st-century Russian women singers
Actresses from Saint Petersburg
Gerasimov Institute of Cinematography alumni
Honored Artists of the RSFSR
Russian film actresses
Russian voice actresses
Russian women singers
Soviet film actresses
Soviet voice actresses
Soviet women singers
Deaths from breast cancer
Deaths from cancer in Russia
Burials at Donskoye Cemetery